Wilkins Coast is that portion of the east coast of the Antarctic Peninsula between Cape Agassiz and Cape Boggs. It was named by the Advisory Committee on Antarctic Names (US-ACAN) for Sir Hubert Wilkins, who in a pioneer Antarctic exploratory flight on December 20, 1928, flew southward from Deception Island and crossed the Antarctic Peninsula to its east side. He continued southward to Stefansson Strait and Hearst Island, which lie midway along Wilkins Coast.

 
Coasts of Palmer Land